Amy Burns Ellis is a Full Professor in the Department of Mathematics and Science Education at the University of Georgia.  She was formerly an associate professor in mathematics education in the Department of Curriculum & Instruction at the University of Wisconsin–Madison.

Education
Ellis received her BA in mathematics (with a minor in Japanese) from Washington University in St. Louis in 1993, and her MA in mathematics from San Jose State University in 1998.  She received her Ph.D. in mathematics and science education in May, 2004, from the University of California at San Diego and San Diego State University.  Her dissertation was titled Relationships between Generalizing and Justifying: Students' Reasoning with Linear Functions

Publications
Ellis has published articles in the Journal for Research in Mathematics Education, Cognition and Instruction, The Journal of the Learning Sciences, Science, and various other journals.  In addition, Ellis has co-authored three books for the Essential Understandings Project book series by the National Council of Teachers of Mathematics, one published in 2010 one in 2011, and one in 2012.

Research funding
Ellis is a principal investigator on a variety of research projects, and has received numerous grants from the National Science Foundation, as well as other funding agencies.

Honors received
Ellis was awarded the Early Career Publication Award from the Research in Mathematics Education special interest group of the American Educational Research Association in 2008.

References

University of Wisconsin–Madison faculty
Living people
Mathematics educators
Year of birth missing (living people)
Washington University in St. Louis mathematicians
Washington University in St. Louis alumni
University of Georgia faculty
San Jose State University alumni
University of California, San Diego alumni
San Diego State University alumni